Carmen Rico Carabias known as Carmen Rico Godoy (30 August 1939 – 12 September 2001) was a Spanish writer, journalist and feminist.

Biography
Daughter of Josefina Carabias, who was also a journalist, and sister of the diplomatic María de las Mercedes Rico, she was born in Paris while her mother was exiled in the French capital since the Spanish Civil War. Her father, a socialist and republican, remained in prison in Francoist Spain until 1944, the year in which the family met in Madrid. Ten years later they were to live in the United States, where her mother was a correspondent for the daily information. At Georgetown University, she studied political science, graduating in 1958. At the beginning of the decade of 1960, installed in Paris, she started to publish in different newspapers. After passing by Argentina, she was established in Spain in 1971. Her journalistic activity focused on the new and successful weekly, Cambio 16, of which she was co-founder. She also published in other journals, film scripts and in the Sunday edition of El Pais. Her last novel, Fin de Fiesta, was a farewell to her readers. She was married to film producer Andrés Vicente Gómez. She died in Madrid on 12 September 2001.

Works

Novels
 Cómo ser mujer y no morir en el intento. (1990)
 Cómo ser infeliz y disfrutarlo (1991)
 Cuernos de mujer (1992)
 La costilla asada de Adán (1996)
 Cortados, solos y con (mala) leche (1999)
 Fin de Fiesta (2001)
 Tirar a matar (2001, unfinished)

Essays
 La neurona iconoclasta.
 Bajo el ficus de La Moncloa.
 Tres mujeres.

Screenplays
 (1988) Miss Caribe, of Fernando Colomo
 (1991) Cómo ser mujer y no morir en el intento (adaptation of her novel of the same name), of Ana Belén
 (1994) Cómo ser infeliz y disfrutarlo (adaptation of her novel of the same name), of Enrique Urbizu.
 (2000) El paraíso ya no es lo que era, of Francesc Betriu

Awards
 1997 – Francisco Cerecedo Journalism Award of the Association of European journalists.

References

 News of the death
 
 
 Interview on  the daily El Mundo in 1997

1939 births
2001 deaths
Spanish feminists
20th-century Spanish journalists
20th-century Spanish novelists